Giuseppe Colombi (Modena, 1635-Modena, 27 or 29 September 1694) was an Italian musician and composer, active in the Baroque period.
In 1674, he was named maestro di cappella for the court in Modena. In 1678, he replaced Giovanni Maria Bononcini as maestro of the Cathedral of Modena. He wrote various symphonies, sonatas, and balletti.

Sources

External links

Italian male classical composers
Italian Baroque composers
Musicians from Modena
1635 births
1694 deaths
17th-century Italian composers
17th-century male musicians